Stefano Manzi (born 29 March 1999) is an Italian motorcycle racer, born in Rimini.

Career

Junior career
Manzi joined the 2012 Red Bull MotoGP Rookies Cup, and had two podiums in his first season already, a 2nd place at the Sachsenring and a 3rd place at Brno. He ended his rookie campaign with 75 points, and 13th in the standings. He returned for both 2013 and 2014, finishing 2013 third in the competition with four 2nd places, and three 3rd places, and again finished third in 2014, with one victory, two 2nd places, and six 3rd places.

Moto3 World Championship

San Carlo Team Italia (2015)
He made his debut in the 2015 Moto3 World Championship, racing from the second round of the season onwards, after being replaced for the opening event by Marco Bezzecchi due to age limits. Riding on a Mahindra MGP3O entered by San Carlo Team Italia, alongside his compatriot Matteo Ferrari, he finished in the points four times, his best result being a twelfth place in Aragon. He ended his rookie year 27th in the standings with 10 points.

Mahindra Racing (2016)
In the 2016 season he appeared in three races as a wild card, scoring a 20th place in Austria, a 4th place at Silverstone, and a 16th place in Rimini. He ended the season 29th in the standings, with 13 points, all 13 coming in Silverstone.

Moto2 World Championship

Sky Racing Team VR46 (2017)
In 2017, Manzi moved up to the Moto2 class with Sky Racing Team VR46 alongside fellow Italian Francesco Bagnaia, riding a Kalex. Manzi finished in the points four times, his best result a 7th place at Silverstone, overall finishing the year with 14 points, 25th in the standings.

Forward Racing Team (2018)
For 2018, Manzi switched to Forward Racing, swapping places with Luca Marini who went to SKY Racing Team VR46. Manzi had a bad year, finishing in the points only twice out of 15 races (a 10th place in France, and a 14th place in Austria), before being involved in a nasty crash during the race in Misano, where Romano Fenati reached over, and pulled Manzi's brakes at 200 km/h. Manzi managed to stay on the bike, but later crashed out on his own, while Fenati was black-flagged and disqualified from the race. Although after the race Fenati was given a two race ban, his contract was terminated with immediate effect by the Rivacold Snipers team, and Manzi raced the following two weekends since he wasn't injured in the accident; when Fenati came back following his two race ban, Manzi sat out the remainder of the season, stating that "I don't feel safe with riders on the track trying to kill me." Manzi finished the year with 8 points, 24th in the championship.

MV Agusta Forward Racing (2019–2020)
He stayed with Forward Racing for the 2019 season, but was now riding MV Agusta bikes. He had a better season than 2018, finishing in the points seven times, four times in the top-10, including a 7th place in Assen, and a 4th place in the season closer round at Valencia. Manzi ended the season 19th in the rider's championship, with 39 points.

In his final year with Forward Racing, the 2020 season saw Manzi grab his first pole position in the category, at the penultimate round in Valencia, marking the first pole position of Forward Racing since 2010, and the first pole position of MV Agusta in 44 years. He unfortunately retired from the race, ending his season with eight point scoring finishes, a best result of 9th in Jerez, and 22nd overall in the championship with 21 points.

Flexbox HP40 (2021)
Riding for Pons Racing in 2021, alongside Héctor Garzó, Manzi had another average year, with seven point scoring finishes, three top-10 finishes in Doha (8th), Mugello (10th), and Misano (6th), ending his last season of Moto2 with 36 points, 19th in the standings.

Yamaha VR46 Master Camp Team (2022)
Manzi replacing Keminth Kubo for this team.

Supersport World Championship

Dynavolt Triumph (2022)
He competed in the 2022 Supersport World Championship, with the Dynavolt Triumph.

Career statistics

Red Bull MotoGP Rookies Cup

Races by year
(key) (Races in bold indicate pole position, races in italics indicate fastest lap)

Grand Prix motorcycle racing

By season

By class

Races by year
(key) (Races in bold indicate pole position, races in italics indicate fastest lap)

Supersport World Championship

Races by year
(key) (Races in bold indicate pole position; races in italics indicate fastest lap)

 Season still in progress.

References

External links

1999 births
Living people
Italian motorcycle racers
Moto3 World Championship riders
Moto2 World Championship riders
Sportspeople from Rimini
Supersport World Championship riders